Napoli, Napoli, Napoli is a 2009 documentary film directed by Abel Ferrara about the problems in early 21st century Naples. Napoli, Napoli, Napoli depicts the city of Naples, filmed as a documentary with interspersed episodes of fiction.

Release 
The film premiered out of competition at the 66th Venice International Film Festival.

Reception 

Variety described the film as a "messy, tawdry blend of documentary and fiction" that "makes for a reasonably interesting if far from revelatory portrait of a city riddled by poverty and crime."

References

External links 

2009 films
Films directed by Abel Ferrara
Italian documentary films
2000s Italian-language films
2009 documentary films
Films set in Naples
Documentary films about cities
Documentary films about Italy
2000s English-language films